Beryozovka is a rural locality (a village) in Karmaskalinsky Selsoviet, Karmaskalinsky District, Bashkortostan, Russia. The population was 12 as of 2010. There are 2 streets or roads.

Geography 
Beryozovka is located 11 km southwest of Karmaskaly (the district's administrative centre) by road. Kachevan is the nearest rural locality.

References 

Rural localities in Karmaskalinsky District